Galbibacter marinus is a Gram-negative, rod-shaped moderately halophilic and non-motile bacterium from the genus of Galbibacter which has been isolated from deep-sea sediments from the Indian Ocean Ridge. Galbibacter marinus has the ability to denitrification.

References

Flavobacteria
Bacteria described in 2013